Little Pond is a small lake located northeast of the hamlet of Lewbeach in Delaware County, New York. Little Pond drains southeast via an unnamed creek that flows into Beaver Kill.

See also
 List of lakes in New York

References 

Lakes of New York (state)
Lakes of Delaware County, New York